Aria is a Belgian comic book series written and drawn by Michel Weyland, with colours by Nadine Weyland. It debuted in Tintin in August 1979.

Synopsis 
Aria is an unbound woman warrior, living in an unknown medieval era which is most likely situated in a parallel universe, or in the future. Technology and magic coexist, while the powers of the spiritual compete with those acquired by humans. Aria fights for the weak and voiceless, oppressed by the powerholders. She eventually overcomes all injustices and hostility, not in the least because of her good looks or fearlessness.

Volumes 
 Le Tribunal des corbeaux (1982; translated as Aria Takes Off in 1986)
 La montagne aux sorciers (1982)
 La septième porte (1983)
 Les chevaliers d'Aquarius (1984)
 Les larmes de la déesse (1985)
 L'anneau des Elflings (1985)
 Le tribunal des corbeaux (1986)
 Le Méridien de Posidonia (1987)  
 Le Combat des dames (1987)  
 Œil d'ange (1988)  
 Les Indomptables (1988)  
 Janessandre (1989)  
 Le Cri du prophète (1990)  
 Le Voleur de lumière (1991)  
 Vendéric (1992)  
 Ove (1994)
 La Vestale de Satan (1995) 
 Vénus en colère (1996) (Raging Venus)
 Sacristar (1997)
 La Fleur au ventre (1998)  
 La Griffe de l'ange (1999) 
 La Voie des rats (2000)  
 Le Poussar (2001) 
 L'Âme captive  (2002)  
 Florineige (2003)  
 Le Jardin de Baohm (2004)  
 Chant d'étoile (2005)  
 L'Élixir du diable (2006)  
 La Poupée aux yeux de lune (2007) 
 Renaissance (2008)  
  La Mamaïtha (2009)  
 Le Diable Recomposé (2010)  
 Les Rescapés du Souvenir (2011)  
 Le Ventre de la Mort (2012)  
 Le Pouvoir des cendres (2013)  
  Le Chemin des crêtes (2014)
 Faîtes taire l'accusée (2015)
 Le Trône du Diable (2017)
 Flames Salvatrices (2019)

Publication  
Le Lombard published the volumes 1–15;  Dupuis (including reprints) volumes 1-30.

Part of the series was also published in the magazine Spirou.

External links 
 Official website of Michel Weyland and Aria  
  List of the albums on the web site of Dupuis  
   List of the albums with specifics on CoinBD.com  

Dupuis titles
Lombard Editions titles
1979 comics debuts
Belgian comics titles
Fantasy comics
Belgian comics characters
Female characters in comics
Fictional women soldiers and warriors
Fictional swordfighters in comics
Comics characters introduced in 1979